Edward Brian Davies FRS (born 13 June 1944) is a former professor of Mathematics, King's College London (1981–2010), and is the author of the popular science book Science in the Looking Glass: What do Scientists Really Know. In 2010, he was awarded a Gauss Lecture by the German Mathematical Society.

Publications

Books

References

External links
 Brian Davies' King's College London Home Page
 Brian Davies' Personal Home Page
 Full proof? Let's trust it to the black box Times Higher Education 1 September 2006
 New Scientist book review of Why Beliefs Matter
 London Mathematical Society Review of Why Beliefs Matter: Reflections on the Nature of Science by Colva Roney-Dougal 
 

1944 births
Living people
Alumni of Jesus College, Oxford
Academics of King's College London
Fellows of King's College London
Fellows of the Royal Society
21st-century British mathematicians
Welsh mathematicians
Fellows of St John's College, Oxford
Academic journal editors
20th-century British mathematicians